The Voice Afrique francophone is the French-speaking African version of the reality singing competition The Voice, broadcast on VoxAfrica. It is based on the show The Voice of Holland, created by John de Mol.

Four coaches, themselves popular performing artists, train singers on their team and occasionally perform with them. The competitors are selected in auditions where the coaches listen to the auditioning contestant without seeing them.

Coaches and hosts 
The show is hosted by Claudy Siar. The original coaching panel included Charlotte Dipanda, Lokua Kanza, A'salfo and Singuila. All four coaches initially returned for the second season, but when the last shows were postponed, A'salfo and Dipanda were replaced by Youssoupha and Josey respectively, to serve as coaches from the Quarterfinals until the end of the season.

For the show's third cycle, Hiro Le Coq were confirmed as a new coach, while Charlotte Dipanda is also returning. On 26 July 2019, it was announced that Nayanka Bell will join the panel, along with Lokua Kanza who returns to the show for his third season as coach.

Series overview  
Colour key

 Team Lokua
 Team Charlotte
 Team Asalfo
 Team Singuila
 Team Nayanka
 Team Hiro

The Voice Afrique Francophone Kids
In February 2019, VoxAfrica announced their version of The Voice Kids, which is expected to start with date which is soon to be announced. Sidiki Diabaté, Daphne Njie, Teeyah and KS Bloom were the coaches of the first season.

The first season of the series premiered on 1 October 2022 and was open to aspiring singers aged 8 to 15.

Notes

  In season 2 of The Voice Afrique Francophone, A'salfo and Charlotte Dipanda originally signed up to serve as coaches full-time. However, due to a postponement which made the season finished later than planned, A'salfo and Dipanda were not able to resume their duties for the last four live shows because of pre-arranged commitments. Youssoupha and Josey replaced them, respectively, and served as coaches from the Quarterfinals until the end of the season. In the third season, Youssoupha again returned as coach replacing Nayanka Bell for the live shows, because Bell was unable to return due to the COVID-19 pandemic.

References

Africa
French-language television shows